Mission Puerto de Purísima Concepción was founded near what is now Yuma, Arizona, United States, on the California side of the Colorado River, in October 1780, by Father Francisco Garcés. The settlement was not part of the California mission chain but was administered as a part of the Spanish missions in Arizona. The Mission site and nearby pueblo were inadequately supported, and Spanish colonists seized the best lands, destroyed the Indians' crops, and generally ignored the rights of the local natives. In retaliation the Quechan (Yuma) Indians and their allies attacked and destroyed the installation and the neighboring Mission San Pedro y San Pablo de Bicuñer over the three days from July 17 to 19, 1781.

Today, only a historical marker on Picacho Road in  Fort Yuma, California, one mile south of Winterhaven Road identifies the site.

California Historical Landmarks read:
NO. 350 MISSION LA PURÍSIMA CONCEPCIÓN (SITE OF) – In October 1780, Father Francisco Garcés and companions began Mission La Purísima Concepción. The mission/pueblo site was inadequately supported. Colonists ignored Indian rights, usurped the best lands, and destroyed Indian crops. Completely frustrated and disappointed, the Quechans (Yumas) and their allies destroyed Concepción on July 17–19, 1781.

See also
 California Historical Landmarks in Imperial County
 Spanish missions in Arizona
 Spanish missions in the Sonoran Desert
 Spanish missions in Baja California
 California Historical Landmark

References

External links

 Missions of the Colorado River
 Discovery of California
 Virtual Tour of California Missions
 California State Landmark plaque

1780 establishments in the Spanish Empire
Spanish missions in Arizona
Spanish missions in California
Catholic Church in Arizona
National Register of Historic Places in Imperial County, California
California Historical Landmarks